The Gotschnagrat is a mountain of the Plessur Alps, overlooking Klosters in the canton of Graubünden. It is a minor prominence on the ridge descending east of the Casanna.

The Gotschnagrat can be reached by cable car from Klosters. In winter it is part of the large ski area between Davos and Klosters. According to the latest Swisstopo maps, the peak is 2,297 m (7,536 ft) high. It has a minor prominence of only 19 m (62 ft).

See also 

 List of mountains of Switzerland accessible by public transport

References

External links
 Gotschnagrat on Hikr

Mountains of the Alps
Mountains of Switzerland
Mountains of Graubünden
Two-thousanders of Switzerland